Virginia Square–GMU is a Washington Metro station in the Virginia Square neighborhood of Arlington, Virginia, United States. The side platformed station opened on December 1, 1979, and is operated by the Washington Metropolitan Area Transit Authority (WMATA). The station serves the Orange and Silver Lines. The station serves the Virginia Square neighborhood as well as the Arlington campus of George Mason University (GMU). The station entrance is located at the intersection of Fairfax Drive and North Monroe Street.

History
Originally to be called Ballston, the station was renamed Virginia Square by the Metro board in March 1977. Its name was changed due to its location at the since-demolished Virginia Square Shopping Center. After several years of construction, the station opened on December 1, 1979.

Known originally as simply Virginia Square, in July 1985 the Metro board voted unanimously to rename the station Virginia Square–GMU, with the "GMU" standing for the adjacent, Arlington campus of George Mason University. Arlington County paid the $50,000 required for the change.

From March 26, 2020 until June 28, 2020, this station was closed due to the 2020 coronavirus pandemic.

Station layout

References

External links
 

 The Schumin Web Transit Center: Virginia Square–GMU Station
 Monroe Street entrance from Google Maps Street View

Stations on the Orange Line (Washington Metro)
Stations on the Silver Line (Washington Metro)
Transportation in Arlington County, Virginia
Washington Metro stations in Virginia
Railway stations in the United States opened in 1979
1979 establishments in Virginia
Railway stations in Virginia at university and college campuses